Corflu is a science fiction fanzine convention held each spring in North America (and three times in Britain). It is named after a slang term for the "correction fluid" used in mimeograph printing, a common way to produce fanzines before the arrival of low-cost photocopying and online fanzines. Each Corflu is organized by a different regional group, selected at the previous year's gathering. Previous Corflus have been held at:

 1984: Berkeley, California
 1985: Napa, California
 1986: Tysons Corner, Virginia
 1987: Cincinnati
 1988: Seattle
 1989: Minneapolis
 1990: New York City
 1991: El Paso
 1992: Los Angeles
 1993: Madison, Wisconsin
 1994: Crystal City, Arlington, Virginia
 1995: Las Vegas
 1996: Nashville, Tennessee
 1997: Walnut Creek, California
 1998: Leeds, England - the first Corflu held outside North America
 1999: Panama City, Florida
 2000: Seattle
 2001: Boston
 2002: Annapolis
 2003: Madison, Wisconsin
 2004: Las Vegas
 2005: San Francisco
 2006: Toronto, Ontario, Canada
 2007: Austin
 2008: Las Vegas
 2009: Seattle
 2010: Winchester, England
 2011: Sunnyvale, California
 2012: Las Vegas
 2013 : Portland
 2014 : Richmond
 2015 : Newcastle-upon-Tyne, England.
 2016: Chicago
 2017: Woodland Hills, California
 2018: Toronto, Ontario, Canada
 2019: Rockville, Maryland
 2020: College Station, Texas
 2021: Bristol, England.

The venue for the 2022 Corflu will be Vancouver, British Columbia, Canada. 

Corflu is a small, informal convention with a single track of programming. Corflu's traditions include choosing the Guest of Honor randomly from the attendees and electing past presidents of the Fan Writers of America (which never has a current president). The Fan Activity Achievement Awards (FAAns) are presented annually at Corflu, and since 2010 a Lifetime Achievement Award has also been presented.

See also 

 Ditto (convention)

References

External links
Corflu official site
Dr. Fandom's Corflu Primer

Science fiction fandom